The electoral district of Essendon is an electoral district of the Victorian Legislative Assembly. It was first created in 1904 after the abolition of the larger Essendon and Flemington electorate, and covers some of the north-western suburbs of Melbourne, including Essendon, Moonee Ponds and Ascot Vale.

The electorate was abolished in 1955, and Ascot Vale created, but in 1958, Ascot Vale was abolished and Essendon re-created.

Essendon was held by the Liberals during the Bolte and Hamer governments, usually due to preferences from the Democratic Labor Party. The Liberals also won the seat after the Kennett landslide of 1992.

Nowadays, the electorate lies within the Labor heartland of western and northern Melbourne, and is considered to be a relatively safe seat for Labor. Judy Maddigan regained the seat for Labor at the 1996 election and retained the seat until her retirement in 2010, when it was won by the then Labor MLC, Justin Madden.

Following the 2012–2013 redivision of State electoral boundaries, Essendon lost electors from Aberfeldie to the electoral district of Niddrie and gained electors from Flemington and Travancore in the electoral district of Melbourne.

Justin Madden retired at the 2014 election and Danny Pearson of the Labor Party was elected in his stead.

Members for Essendon

Election results

Graphical summary

References

External links
 Electorate profile: Essendon District, Victorian Electoral Commission

Electoral districts of Victoria (Australia)
1904 establishments in Australia
1955 disestablishments in Australia
1958 establishments in Australia
Essendon, Victoria
Electoral districts and divisions of Greater Melbourne